Astragalus bernardinus, known by the common name San Bernardino milkvetch, is a species of milkvetch. It is a plant of desert and dry mountain slope habitat.

Distribution
The plant is native to the San Bernardino Mountains of Southern California. It is also found in the Mojave Desert sky islands, in the Ivanpah Mountains  and nearby New York Mountains which straddle the California—Nevada state line.

Description
Astragalus bernardinus  is a slender, wiry perennial herb growing in twisted clumps, sometimes clinging to other plants for support. The stems are 10 to 50 centimeters long and mostly naked, coated partly in stiff hairs. The leaves are up to 14 centimeters long and are made up of widely spaced pairs of lance-shaped leaflets. The inflorescence is a loose cluster of up to 25 light purple pealike flowers. The fruit is a pale-colored legume pod up to 3 centimeters long which dries to a papery texture.

References

External links
Jepson Manual Treatment
The Nature Conservancy
USDA Plants Profile
Photo gallery

bernardinus
Flora of California
Flora of Nevada
Flora of the California desert regions
Natural history of the Mojave Desert
Natural history of the Transverse Ranges
~
Natural history of San Bernardino County, California